Kot Waris is a small village about 8 Kilometers from Ghakhar Mandi, Pakistan. There is a primary school for both girls and boys.

Villages in Gujranwala District